Angel Down is the third solo release and the first studio album by heavy metal singer Sebastian Bach. Released on November 20, 2007, it is the first release to feature all original studio recorded material. It is also Bach's first release since his 2001 release Bach 2: Basics. The album gained attention due to Guns N' Roses lead singer Axl Rose's guest appearance on three tracks and Bach's appearance on MTV's Celebrity Rap Superstar. The front cover art of the album is David Lees's photo for Life magazine of the 1966 Florence flood.

Reception 

In an exclusive preview of the album, Paul Cashmere of Undercover described Angel Down as "The metal album of the year, if not the 21st Century so far."

On October 27, 2007, "Back in the Saddle" was played on the Texas radio station Q94.5. According to the station, the phones rang off the hook when the single was played and it became the station's No. 1 most requested track and also charted at number 4 in Finland, however the album only debuted at No. 191 on the Billboard Top 200 chart, selling 6,400 copies in its first week.

Track listing

DVD (limited edition) 
The Angel Down DVD is included on the limited edition of the album and features a documentary titled "Roadrage" made by Sebastian Bach himself and features a close look at the making of the album and backstage vision with the Trailer Park Boys.

The DVD also includes six live performances and a music video.
 "American Metalhead"
 "Stuck Inside"
 "(Love Is) a Bitchslap"
 "You Don't Understand"
 "By Your Side"
 "By Your Side (Acoustic)" (bonus)
 "(Love Is) a Bitchslap" (music video)

Personnel 
 Sebastian Bach – lead vocals
 "Metal" Mike Chlasciak – guitar
 Johnny Chromatic – guitar
 Steve DiGiorgio – bass
 Bobby Jarzombek – drums and percussion

Additional personnel 
 Axl Rose – vocals on "Back in the Saddle"; backup vocals on "(Love Is) a Bitchslap" and "Stuck Inside"; writing credits on "Stuck Inside"
 Adam Albright – guitar on "Angel Down"
 Ed Ross – piano and strings on "By Your Side" and "Falling into You"
 Roy Z – guitar tracks 2, 4, 9, 10

Chart positions

Trivia
Bach also has the album cover tattooed on his arm.  The tattoo was done by Kat Von D.  He was a celebrity guest on her show LA Ink.

References 

2007 debut albums
Sebastian Bach albums
Caroline Records albums
Albums produced by Roy Z